The 2011 Assen Superleague Formula round, also referred to as the 2011 Superleague Formula GP Holland, was a Superleague Formula round  held on June 5, 2011, at the TT Circuit Assen, Assen, Netherlands. It was the second ever round at the Assen circuit, following a round in 2010. It was the first round, or 'Grand Prix', of the 2011 Superleague Formula season.

Fourteen cars took part, however only six sported the liveries of football clubs as per Superleague Formula tradition. The rest were branded with the colours of particular nations. Two cars from the Netherlands took part: PSV Eindhoven and Team Netherlands.

Support races included the Dutch Supercar Challenge, Formula Renault 2.0 Northern European Cup, the German Formula Three Championship and Superkart racing.

Report

Qualifying

Race 1

Race 2

Super Final

Results

Qualifying
 In each group, the top four qualify for the quarter-finals.

Group A

Group B

Knockout stages

Standings after the round

References

External links
 Official results from the Superleague Formula website

Assen
Superleague Formula